The 2015 Judo Grand Prix Ulaanbaatar was held at the Buyant Ukhaa Sport Complex in Ulaanbaatar, Mongolia from 3 to 5 July 2015.

Medal summary

Men's events

Women's events

Source Results

Medal table

References

External links
 

2015 IJF World Tour
2015 Judo Grand Prix
IJF World Tour Ulaanbaatar
Judo
Grand Prix 2015
Judo
Judo
Judo